Grover Greer "Bud" Delp (September 7, 1932 – December 29, 2006) was an American Hall of Fame Thoroughbred racehorse trainer best remembered for his conditioning of Hall of Fame colt, Spectacular Bid, who according to Delp was "The greatest horse to ever look through a bridle".

Bud Delp began his career as a Thoroughbred trainer in 1962 and in 1980 was voted the Eclipse Award for Outstanding Trainer. Delp, along with John J. Tammaro, Jr., King T. Leatherbury and Richard E. Dutrow, Sr. were known as Maryland racing's "Big Four" who dominated racing in that state during the 1960s and 1970s and who helped modernize thoroughbred racing.

During his career, Bud Delp's horses won 3,674 races and earned purses totaling nearly $41 million. He ended his career at a 20.5 win percentage. In 2002, an honor he said he was most proud of, Delp was inducted into the United States' National Museum of Racing and Hall of Fame.

References
 Bud Delp at the United States' National Museum of Racing and Hall of Fame
 Bud Delp's obituary at Bloodhorse.com
 Bud Delp's obituary at the Washington Post

1932 births
2006 deaths
American racehorse trainers
Eclipse Award winners
United States Thoroughbred Racing Hall of Fame inductees
Deaths from cancer in Maryland
People from Harford County, Maryland
People from Ellicott City, Maryland